Prior Smith (born 1944) is a Canadian broadcaster who owns and operates the network radio program Canada Calling and, for 35 years, produced the Canadian syndicated radio show "Grapeline".

Broadcasting career

Born in Toronto, Ontario, Smith began his career in radio broadcasting with brief stints as a news reporter/announcer at CKLY-Lindsay, Ontario, (1966) CHYR Leamington/Windsor, Ontario (1967) and CJSS Cornwall, Ontario (1968) before moving to CJAD Montreal, Quebec in 1968.  After one year at CJAD he moved to the legendary CFRB in Toronto in 1969.  He worked as a general assignment news reporter/newscaster for the next 18 years.

While working in news at CFRB, Smith branched into radio network syndication creating and distributing a number of national radio programs, the most prominent of which was Grapeline featuring hockey commentator Don Cherry and sports broadcaster Brian Williams. The program, the longest running nationally syndicated radio show in Canadian history, started in the fall of 1984 and concluded in the spring of 2019.

Also during his time at CFRB, Smith created a syndicated radio news program to serve traveling and vacationing Canadians across the southern United States.

Canada Calling
Canada Calling is a daily radio newscast prepared in southern Ontario throughout the winter months. It is available on demand online at http://www.canadacalling.com and syndicated to a network of radio stations across the U.S. Sunbelt and the Bahamas, serving the more than three million Canadian vacationers who travel south each winter.

The original program was created by CBC sports and news announcer Dave Price. It was launched January 2, 1954 on stations in Miami Beach and Tampa.

Price would retire in the mid-1970s, selling the operations to Canadian broadcast executive Finlay MacDonald.

In 1977 Smith formed his own network and his coverage of the market quickly expanded to include all of Florida, The Bahamas, Arizona, southern California and south Texas. For a brief period the two networks competed for audience before Price's original service ceased operations. Smith has carried on the Canada Calling tradition as on air host each winter season for the past 46 years during which time he has never missed a day. Canada Calling is now in its 69th season.

Canada Calling's six decades on air throughout Florida was honored by the Florida Association of Broadcasters at its annual convention in Miami Beach June 26, 2013 with Prior Smith in attendance representing the longest running radio show in Florida history.

References 

 WWBF
 WSRQ-FM
 https://web.archive.org/web/20090207011901/http://www.broadcastdialogue.com/article_view.asp?action=view&idnumber=407
 http://www.heraldtribune.com/article/20051212/COLUMNIST50/512120580?Title=-Canada-Calling-Prior-Smith-weighs-in-on-the-time-changes
 http://pcbpress.ypbr.com/news/01-27-2009
 https://www.nytimes.com/1982/02/27/business/bitter-cold-makes-it-easier-to-sell-the-sun-to-canadians.html
 http://www.broadcastermagazine.com/news/great-sports-programming-a-real-achievement-but-two-hundred-grand-doesnt-hurt/1000229484/?&er=NA
 http://www.broadcastermagazine.com/news/canada-calling-radio-network-to-begin-60th-season/1002660901/
 https://www.theglobeandmail.com/sports/grapeline-endures-with-winning-formula-of-commentary-and-chemistry/article726161/
 https://torontosun.com/news/local-news/don-cherry-grapevine

External links
 Canada Calling

1944 births
Living people
Canadian radio personalities
People from Toronto
International broadcasting
Canadian diaspora in North America